These are the Billboard R&B singles chart number-one singles of 2005.

Chart history

See also
2005 in music
List of number-one R&B hits (United States)

References

2005
United States RandB singles
2005 in American music